Kirk Randal Botkin (born March 19, 1971) is the former defensive coordinator for the South Carolina State University Bulldogs football team and a former American football tight end and long snapper who played four seasons in the NFL with the New Orleans Saints and the Pittsburgh Steelers. He has since coached football at the collegiate level. Botkin and his wife, the former Rebecca Holloway, have three children.

Early life
Botkin was born in Baytown, Texas, where he attended Robert E. Lee High School.

College football
Botkin matriculated at the University of Arkansas.  In 1992, he was selected to the All-SEC football team, named by the conference's coaches.  He was the first Razorback to earn that honor.

Pro football career
Botkin went undrafted in the 1994 NFL Draft, but was signed by the New England Patriots just afterward.  He was released by the Patriots during training camp in August 1994.  He was picked up by the New Orleans Saints once the 1994 season was underway.  He remained with the Saints though the 1995 season.

Botkin was waived by the Saints prior to the 1996 season, but was claimed off waivers by the Pittsburgh Steelers.  He was used by the Steelers over the next two seasons primarily as a long snapper, but also saw some work at tight end due to an injury to the team's starting tight end, Mark Bruener.

Botkin did not return for 1998 after the Steelers rescinded a contract offer to him.

Coaching career
Botkin was the linebackers coach for the South Carolina Gamecocks from 2012-2016. Previously, Botkin was hired as a football coach at Jacksonville State University by head coach Jack Crowe under whom Botkin had played at Arkansas.  He moved on to become the linebackers coach and special teams coordinator at the University of Louisiana at Monroe in 2006.

Botkin returned to his alma mater, Arkansas, in 2008 as the defensive ends coach and special teams coordinator under head coach Bobby Petrino.  He was relieved of his special teams responsibilities in 2009, but remained as a defensive coach.  He left Arkansas in January 2010. Then took a job at Texas High School in Texarkana, Texas (along with 2 other ex-NFL players: Earnest Rhone and Cody Spencer.  On January 13, 2012, Botkin was named linebackers coach for the South Carolina Gamecocks. Botkin was relieved of his duties as linebackers coach at South Carolina after the retirement of Steve Spurrier. Botkin was then hired by the South Carolina State University Bulldogs in Orangeburg, SC as the defensive coordinator in February 2016.

References

1971 births
Living people
People from Baytown, Texas
Players of American football from Texas
American football tight ends
Arkansas Razorbacks football players
New Orleans Saints players
Pittsburgh Steelers players
Sportspeople from Harris County, Texas